In the British English-speaking world, The King refers to:
 Charles III (born 1948), King of the United Kingdom and other Commonwealth realms since 2022

As a nickname 
 Michael Jackson (1958–2009), American singer and pop icon, nicknamed "The King of Pop"
 Shah Rukh Khan (born 1965), Indian actor, nicknamed "King Khan"
 Martin Luther King Jr. (1929–1968), civil rights activist
 Kingsley Amis (1922–1995), British novelist
 Zohar Argov (1955–1987), Israeli singer
 Melvin Belli (1905–1996) American attorney "The King of Torts"
 Kenny Bernstein (born 1944), American drag racing driver nicknamed "The King of Speed"
 Ole Einar Bjørndalen (born 1974), Norwegian biathlete nicknamed "The King of Biathlon"
 James Brown (Elvis impersonator) (born 1968), Elvis impersonator
 Eric Cantona (born 1966), French footballer
 Wayne Carey (born 1971), Australian rules footballer
 Kenny Dalglish (born 1951), Scottish football player and manager
 Benny Goodman (born 1909), American entertainer "The King of Swing"
 Gheorghe Hagi (born 1965), Romanian footballer
 Félix Hernández (born 1986), American baseball pitcher
 LeBron James (born 1984), American basketball player
 Barry John (born 1945), Welsh rugby player
 Graham Kennedy (1934–2005), Australian television performer
 Richard Kingsmill (born 1964), Australian radio host
 Jack Kirby (1917–1994), American comics artist
 Denis Law (born 1940), Scottish footballer
 Jerry Lawler (born 1949), American professional wrestler
 King Levinsky (1910–1991), American heavyweight boxer
 Wally Lewis (born 1959), Australian rugby league player
 Jari Litmanen (born 1971), Finnish footballer
 Henrik Lundqvist (born 1982), NHL Goalie of the New York Rangers
 Hugh McElhenny (born 1928), NFL Hall of Fame running back "The King"
 Mohamed Mounir (born 1954), Egyptian singer
 Eli Ohana, nicknamed the King (born 1964), Israeli soccer coach and manager
 Arnold Palmer (1929-2016), American golfer
 Pelé (1940-2022), Brazilian footballer
 Elvis Presley (1935–1977), American entertainer, "The King of Rock and Roll"
 Richard Petty (born 1937), American NASCAR driver
 Fernando Poe Jr. (1939–2004), Philippine actor and National Artist nicknamed "Da King"
 Henry Shefflin (born 1979), Kilkenny hurler
 Tom Cato Visnes, Norwegian musician and teacher
 Jan-Ove Waldner (born 1965), table tennis player
 Clark Gable (1901–1960), American movie star "The King of Hollywood"
 George Strait (born 1952), American entertainer and country music icon "The King of Country"
 Bob Wills (born 1905), Country Western entertainer "The King of Western Swing"

In film and television

Films 
 The King (1995 film), a Malayalam movie directed by Shaji Kailas
 The King (2002 film), a Greek drama film directed by Nikos Grammatikos
 The King (2005 film), an American drama directed by James Marsh
 The King (2007 film), an Australian biopic directed by Matthew Saville
 The King – Jari Litmanen, a Finnish documentary directed by Arto Koskinen
 The King (2017 South Korean film), a political crime thriller directed by Han Jae-rim
 The King (2017 American film), a film about Elvis Presley, directed by Eugene Jarecki
 The King (2019 film), an American-Australian historical drama film directed by David Michôd

Other 

 "The King", a 2003 episode of the TV series Teenage Mutant Ninja Turtles
 "The King", a 2010 episode of the British television programme The King is Dead
 Eddie "The King" Faroo, a character in the 1992 film White Men Can't Jump
 Strip "The King" Weathers, a character in the animated film Cars based on and voiced by Richard Petty
 The King, a recurring character from the American television show Drawn Together

In gaming 
 The King, the chess engine in the computer game Chessmaster
 The King, a character in the video game Fallout: New Vegas, voiced by James Horan
 The King of All Cosmos, a character in the Katamari Damacy video game series

Music

Albums 
 The King (Benny Carter album), a 1976 album by jazz saxophonist/composer Benny Carter
The King!, a 1968 album by jazz saxophonist Illinois Jacquet
 The King (Teenage Fanclub album), the second album by British alternative rock band Teenage Fanclub
 The King, a 2021 extended play by Sarah Kinsley

Songs 
 "The King" (The Playtones song), 2011
 "The King", by Accept from I'm a Rebel, 1980
 "The King", by Enter Shikari from Nothing Is True & Everything Is Possible, 2020
 "The King", by Grandmaster Flash and the Furious Five from On the Strength, 1988
 "The King", by James Brown from the expanded re-release of Live at the Garden, 2009
 "The King", by Loreena McKennitt from To Drive the Cold Winter Away, 1987
 "The King", by Paul Brandt from This Time Around, 2004
 "The King", by Steeleye Span from Please to See the King, 1971
 "The King", by T.I. from Urban Legend, 2004
 "The King", by Conan Gray, 2019

Other uses 
 The Burger King, an advertising mascot for fast-food restaurant chain Burger King
 The King, an alias of the DC Comics character King Standish

See also 
 List of current monarchs of sovereign states
 King (disambiguation)